The 2010 season was Pattaya United's 2nd season in the top division of Thai football. This article shows statistics of the club's players in the season, and also lists all matches that the club played in the season.

Team kit

Chronological list of events
10 November 2009: The Thai Premier League 2010 season first leg fixtures were announced.
15 September 2010: Pattaya United were knocked out of the Thai FA Cup by Chonburi in the quarter final.
24 October 2010: Pattaya United finished in 6th place in the Thai Premier League.

Players

Current squad

2010 Season transfers
In

Out

Results

Thai Premier League

FA Cup

Third round

Fourth round

Quarter-finals

League Cup

First round

1st Leg

2nd Leg

Second round

1st Leg

2nd Leg

Third round

1st Leg

2nd Leg

League table

Queen's Cup

References

Thai football clubs 2010 season
Pattaya United F.C. seasons